In Czechoslovakia the first parliamentary elections to the National Assembly were held in 1920, two years after the country came into existence. They followed the adoption of the 1920 constitution. Prior to the elections, a legislature had been formed under the name Revolutionary National Assembly, composed of the Czech deputies elected in 1911 in Cisleithania, Slovak deputies elected in Hungary in 1910 and other co-opted deputies.

First Czechoslovak Republic (1918–1938)

Parliamentary elections in the First Czechoslovak Republic were held in 1920, 1925, 1929 and 1935. The Czechoslovak National Assembly at the time consisted of a Chamber of Deputies (300 members) and a Senate (150 members). Parliamentarians were elected under a proportional representation system using multi-member electoral districts.

Second Czechoslovak Republic (1938–1939)
After the German occupation of Czechoslovakia in 1938, political parties suspended the democratic elements of elections. In the 1938 elections in Slovakia, parties not affiliated with the united list of Hlinka's Slovak People's Party were suspended. The 1938 elections took the form of referendum with the question "Do you want a new, free Slovakia?". No elections took place in the Protectorate of Bohemia and Moravia or the Slovak Republic that existed between 1939 and 1945.

Third Czechoslovak Republic (1945–1948)
The only elections to the Constituent National Assembly were held in 1946, although with a limited number of political parties within the National Front. These were last free elections until 1990, following a 1948 coup.

Elections in Communist Czechoslovakia (1948–1989)

Elections in the Czech and Slovak Federative Republic (1990–1992)
With the decline of Communism, free elections were again reintroduced in 1990. These elections were held into each chambers of Federal Assembly and into each National Councils of the constituent republics:
1990 Czech election
1990 Slovak election

After the 1992 parliamentary elections, the victorious parties initiated the dissolution of Czechoslovakia, which took place on 1 January 1993.

References

See also
Elections in the Czech Republic
Elections in Slovakia